Aryeh Leib Malin (1906–1962) was a Polish-born American Haredi Jewish rabbi, Talmudic scholar, and Mussarist who taught the Torah and spread rabbinical education in Europe, China, Japan, and the United States.

Early life and education

Aryeh Leib Malin was born in Mileitzitz near Białystok, in Poland. His father, Rabbi Avraham Moshe, served as a dayan (rabbinical court judge) in Mileitzitz. In his early years, Malin learned in Grodno under Rabbi Shimon Shkop. Later he learned under Rabbis Elchonon Wasserman and Baruch Ber Lebowitz. As an older student, he was educated in the Mir Yeshiva of Belarus, where he gained a reputation as a prototype-follower of lomdus (in-depth study) and a model of mussar. In the study of mussar methodology and literature, Malin became a prominent student of Rabbi Yeruchom Levovitz, and he edited the second volume of Rabbi Levovitz's book Daas Chochma U'Mussar. Rabbi Yechiel Michel Feinstein, a son-in-law of Rabbi Yitzchok Zev Soloveitchik, the Brisker Rav, said of Malin that he had an ability to totally immerse himself into whatever Talmudical tractate was being learned in Mir.

At the request of Rabbi Isser Zalman Meltzer, Mir rosh yeshiva Rabbi Eliezer Yehuda Finkel sent a group of his finest scholars to Brisk to hear the Brisker Rav's lectures. Among the group that heard the Rav's shiurim on Kodashim were Malin, Ephraim Mordechai Ginsburg, Yonah Karpilov (Yonas Ilem), and the Brisker Rav's future son-in-law, Yechiel Michel Feinstein. During this period, Malin became especially close to the Brisker Rav, who took a special liking to him. Malin was able to record many of the Brisker Rav's lectures, which were later published in stencil form. He also was given special access to manuscripts of Rabbi Chaim Brisker. Rabbi Berel Povarsky of Ponevezh yeshiva – who edited and published Malin's writings, Chidushei Reb Aryeh Leib – branded his uncle's Torah as "Brisker Torah," meaning that it continues the tradition of Brisk.

In Mir, Malin was part of an elite group of students who served as models of proper behavior and learning. This group was highly respected by the leading posek, Rabbi Chaim Ozer Grodzensky, and was still fondly remembered decades later by Rabbi Chaim Pinchas Scheinberg. In 1941, in the midst of World War II, Malin declined an invitation to immigrate to the United States, extended to him by Rabbi Avraham Kalmanowitz. Instead, he fled from Nazi-occupied Europe and followed the Mir Yeshiva into exile in Shanghai, China.

During this time, he took on many administrative duties in the yeshiva. He played a major role in the committee that was involved in the logistics of moving the yeshiva first to Kobe, in Japan, where the yeshiva spent about half a year, and then back to Shanghai, where the yeshiva remained until the end of the war.

In the United States

In the post-war period, Malin moved to the United States. Immediately upon his immigration to America, he rejected proposals from Rabbi Moshe Feinstein to become rosh yeshiva of Mesivtha Tifereth Jerusalem and Rabbi Avraham Kalmanowitz to become the rosh yeshiva of the newly established Brooklyn branch of the Mir yeshiva. Instead, after his 1948 marriage to Yaffa Kreiser, daughter of Rabbi Dovid Ber Kreiser, av beis din of Greiver, Poland and a rosh yeshiva in Kletsk, Malin opted to create a yeshiva and kollel modeled on the Mir of pre-war Europe. He founded the Beth Hatalmud Rabbinical College in Brooklyn, which he regarded as a continuation of Volozhin yeshiva, Slabodka yeshiva, and Mir yeshiva.

As rosh yeshiva of Beis HaTalmud, Malin upheld standards of Torah and mussar that were instructive in themselves. One time, he announced that he would deliver a lecture on a certain sugya and then, on the day of the scheduled lecture, he cancelled it. He explained that he had been unable to see the proper desire on the part of the students to hear the lecture.

Despite being busy with the yeshiva's affairs, Malin would spend hours immersed in Torah study. About nine months before his death, he was injured by a stone thrown at him by a hooligan. On the last day of his life, he was seen in the women's section of the study hall, standing with his hands outstretched, deeply immersed in prayer. A student who saw him, who later became a prominent doctor, concluded that Malin was then suffering a heart attack. Later, Malin collapsed after arriving late to a meeting in the house of Rabbi Shabsai Frankel (who famously re-printed the works of Maimonides). He was 56 years old.

Rabbi Aharon Kotler said at Malin's funeral that the Jewish communities were deprived of a potential leader for the next generation with Malin's death.

Works and influences
Malin's main work, Chidushei Rebbi Aryeh Leib, was published posthumously by his nephew Baruch Dov Povarsky. This work is on the entire scope of Shas, and is used in many present-day yeshivas, especially in matters concerning Kodashim and Nezikin, for which the work is famous. Two of Malin's students were Rabbi Mordechai Elefant and Rabbi Shimshon Dovid Pincus.

He "began publishing the Torah journal HaTevunoh as a vehicle for the Torah writings of the bnei hachaburoh" and also included 
"several of Reb Yeruchum's shmuessen in each issue."

Students 
 Rabbi Mordechai Elefant
 Rabbi Nosson Kamenetsky
 Rabbi Shimshon Dovid Pincus
 Rabbi Chaim Ozer Gorelick
 Rabbi Haim Benoliel

External links 
Leader of the Lions: The Story of Rav Leib Malin by Dovi Safier & Yehuda Geberer
Some Lines in His Memory -- 29th Teves 5764 by Rebbetzin Yaffa Malin-Ebner

References

1906 births
1962 deaths
20th-century American rabbis
20th-century Polish rabbis
American Haredi rabbis
American people of Belarusian-Jewish descent
Belarusian Haredi rabbis
Burials at Har HaMenuchot
Haredi rosh yeshivas
Mir Yeshiva alumni
Musar movement
People from Białystok
Polish expatriates in China
Polish expatriates in Japan
Polish expatriates in the United States
Polish Haredi rabbis